Her Honor, the Governor is a 1926 American silent drama film starring Pauline Frederick, directed by Chester Withey and featuring Boris Karloff. Complete prints of the film survive.

Cast
 Pauline Frederick as Adele Fenway
 Carroll Nye as Bob Fenway
 Greta von Rue as Marian Lee
 Tom Santschi as Richard Palmer
 Stanton Heck as Jim Dornton
 Boris Karloff as Snipe Collins
 Jack Richardson as Slade
 Charles McHugh
 Kathleen Kirkham
 William Worthington

See also
 Boris Karloff filmography

References

External links

1926 films
1926 drama films
Silent American drama films
Surviving American silent films
American silent feature films
American black-and-white films
Films directed by Chester Withey
Film Booking Offices of America films
1920s American films